Worried Man Blues: Their Complete Victor Recordings (1930) is a compilation of recordings made by American country music group the Carter Family, released in 1995. It is the fourth of nine compilations released by Rounder Records of the group's Victor recordings.

History 
The original Carter Family group consisted of Alvin Pleasant "A.P." Delaney Carter, his wife Sara Dougherty Carter, and his sister-in-law Maybelle Addington Carter. A.P. traveled around the southwestern Virginia area in search of new songs, resulting in many traditional songs being copyrighted in his name. In 1927, the trio auditioned for record producer Ralph Peer and subsequently began their recording career with Victor.

By the end of 1930 the trio had sold 300,000 records in the U.S.

The tracks have all been digitally remastered.

Reception 
In his No Depression review, critic Kels Koch stated, "What counts 65 years later is that these recordings — as crucial a patch in American music’s tapestry as any — are back in print to entertain and console yet another generation: ours." Larry Stephens stated in his Country Standard Time review, "The 1930 songs feature an unusual amount of trio work along with some of the Carters' more standard duets. Many came from A. P. 's song hunting trips into the mountains. Be prepared for a lot of repetition in sound. Given they only used two instruments and no special effects, there is certain to be a sameness."

Track listing 
All songs are credited to A. P. Carter unless otherwise noted.
 "I Have an Aged Mother" – 3:20
 "The Dying Soldier" – 3:02
 "Worried Man Blues" – 2:43
 "Lonesome Valley" – 2:38
 "On the Rock Where Moses Stood" (A. P. Carter, Sara Carter, Maybelle Carter) – 3:07
 "Room in Heaven for Me" – 2:49
 "Lonesome Pine Special" – 2:58
 "No More the Moon Shines on Lorena" – 3:02
 "On My Way to Canaan's Land" – 3:03
 "Where Shall I Be?" – 2:51
 "Sow 'Em on the Mountain" – 2:51
 "Darling Nellie Across the Sea" – 2:46
 "The Birds Were Singing of You" – 3:05
 "Weary Prodigal Son" – 2:39
 "My Old Cottage Home" – 2:55
 "When I'm Gone" – 3:02

Personnel 
A. P. Carter – vocals
Maybelle Carter – vocals, guitar, autoharp
Sara Carter – vocals, autoharp
Production notes:
Ralph Peer – producer
Wulfing von Rohr – producer
Jim Oliver – producer, liner notes
Dr. Toby Mountain – mastering
Scott Billington – design
Charles K. Wolfe – liner notes, photography
Boris Mourashkin – liner notes
Dr. Jeffrey D. Thompson – liner notes

References

External links 
The Carter Family: A Comprehensive Discography

Carter Family albums
1995 compilation albums
Rounder Records compilation albums